Zhang Wei (born 19 January 1993) is a Chinese footballer.

Club career
Zhang Wei started his football career with Jiangsu Sainty during the 2014 season  after playing for Jiangsu Youth during the 2011 season and the 2012 season. He was diagnosed with heart disease and received surgery by the end of 2012. On 23 July 2014, Zhang made his debut for Jiangsu Sainty in the 2014 Chinese FA Cup against Lijiang Jiayunhao, coming on as a substitute for Sun Ke in the 80th minute. His Super League debut came on 26 October 2014 in the 2014 Chinese Super League against Shanghai East Asia, coming on as a substitute for Edinson Toloza in the 61st minute. 
On 16 February 2016, Zhang was loaned to China League Two side Nantong Zhiyun.
On 22 June 2016, Zhang was loaned to China League Two side Chengdu Qbao until 31 December 2016.  He made a permanent transfer to Nantong Zhiyun in March 2017.

Career statistics
Statistics accurate as of match played 4 November 2018.

References

1993 births
Living people
Sportspeople from Nantong
Chinese footballers
Footballers from Jiangsu
Jiangsu F.C. players
Nantong Zhiyun F.C. players
Chinese Super League players
Footballers at the 2014 Asian Games
Association football forwards
Asian Games competitors for China